Here are the rosters which took part on the 2005 FIFA Club World Championship, held in Japan, between 11 December and 18 December 2005.

Al Ahly 
Head coach:  Manuel José de Jesus

Al-Ittihad 
Head coach:  Anghel Iordănescu

*
*

*

 Pedrinho, Marcao and Lima were not permitted to play in 2005 FIFA Club World Championship, because Al-Ittihad acquired them after the permitted time.

Saprissa 
Head coach:  Hernan Medford

Liverpool 
Head coach:  Rafael Benítez

*

*

*

 Danny O'Donnell, Darren Potter and David Raven did not travel to Japan and did not play at the competition

São Paulo 
Head coach:  Paulo Autuori

 (captain)

Sydney FC 
Head coach:  Pierre Littbarski

*

 Ruben Zadkovich was not entitled to play at the tournament.

External links
 
 

Squads
FIFA Club World Cup squads